The 2019–20 Tampa Bay Lightning season was the 28th season for the National Hockey League (NHL) franchise that was established on December 16, 1991. The Lightning entered the season as the defending Atlantic Division and Presidents' Trophy champions.

The season was suspended by the league officials on March 12, 2020, after several other professional and collegiate sports organizations followed suit as a result of the COVID-19 pandemic. On May 26, the NHL regular season was officially declared over with the remaining games being cancelled. On July 10, following the extension of the NHL Collective Bargaining Agreement by the league and the Players' Association, it was announced that the Canadian cities of Toronto and Edmonton would be the locations the 2020 Stanley Cup playoffs would be staged in.  The conclusion of the playoffs would be held in Edmonton as the site of both conference finals and the Stanley Cup Finals.

The playoffs began on August 1 in a modified format involving 24 teams. The Lightning began in Toronto with the other Eastern Conference teams and were given a bye into the first round by virtue of having the second-highest point percentage in the Eastern Conference at the time of the pause. For seeding, they competed in a four-team single round-robin along with the Boston Bruins, Washington Capitals, and Philadelphia Flyers, in which they finished in second place. The Lightning then defeated the Columbus Blue Jackets in the first round in five games, and the Boston Bruins in the second round, also in five games. Shifting to Edmonton, they competed in their fourth Eastern Conference Finals in the past six seasons, defeating the New York Islanders in six games.

On September 28, 2020, the Lightning won their second Stanley Cup in franchise history, and the first in 16 years since 2004 after defeating the Dallas Stars in six games. Victor Hedman won the Conn Smythe Trophy as playoff MVP.

On August 27, the playoffs were briefly suspended as the remaining teams decided not to play their next scheduled contests in the wake of the shooting of Jacob Blake.

Off-season

April
The Lightning's off season began on April 16, 2019, when they were swept by the Columbus Blue Jackets in the first round of the 2019 Stanley Cup playoffs.

May
The Lightning's first move of the off season happened on May 3, 2019, when the team signed Jan Rutta to a 1-year contract extension. Rutta appeared in 14 regular season games and 4 playoffs games for the Lightning after coming over in a trade from the Chicago Blackhawks.

On May 23, 2019, the Lightning and forward prospect Jonne Tammela mutually agreed to part ways via contract termination. On May 28, 2019, Tammela signed with Lukko of the Liiga hockey league in Finland.

June
On June 14, 2019, the Lightning re-signed defenceman Cameron Gaunce to a 1-year contract extension. Last season Gaunce appeared in two regular season games with the Lightning.

On June 18, 2019, the Lightning re-signed defenceman Braydon Coburn to a two-year contract extension valued at $3.4 million. The contract will carry a $1.7 million cap hit. Coburn was coming off a three-year contract with the team. In 74 games last season Coburn produced 23 points, which set a personal best during his tenure with the club.

On June 19, 2019, the Lightning announced that they had re-signed defenceman Daniel Walcott to a 1-year contract extension. Walcott missed the majority of the previous season due to injury.

That same evening, the NHL conducted the 2019 NHL Awards in Las Vegas. Nikita Kucherov was awarded the Ted Lindsay Award and Hart Memorial Trophy. Kucherov was the second player in franchise history win the Ted Lindsay Award and Hart Memorial Trophy. Andrei Vasilevskiy was awarded the Vezina Trophy. Vasilevskiy was the first goaltender in franchise history to win the award. Additionally, the NHL announced the NHL All-Star teams and the NHL All-Rookie Team. Nikita Kucherov and Andrei Vasilevskiy were named to the NHL first All-Star team and Victor Hedman was named to the NHL second All-Star team. Anthony Cirelli was named to the All-Rookie Team.

On June 20, 2019, the Lightning announced that Ryan Callahan had been diagnosed with a degenerative disk disease of the lower spine. Doctors gave Callahan the recommendation that it was medically in his best interest to no longer play hockey.  The team further announced that it would be placing Callahan on Long Term Injured Reserve for the upcoming season, which is the final year of his contract. Callahan stated in an interview after the announcement that his back had been an issue for him for the last few seasons and that this past season was the worst it had been. Callahan will finish his career with 757 games played, recording 186 goals and 386 points.

On June 22, 2019, the Lightning traded forward J. T. Miller to the Vancouver Canucks on the second day of the 2019 NHL Entry Draft. The Lightning received goaltender Marek Mazanec, a 3rd-round pick in 2019, and a conditional 1st-round pick in the 2020 NHL Entry Draft. The condition of the pick is that if the Canucks miss the playoffs in the coming season the pick becomes a 1st-round pick in 2021.

July
On July 5, 2019, the Lightning re-signed forward Carter Verhaeghe to a 1-year contract extension. Verhaeghe led the Syracuse Crunch and American Hockey League in scoring with 82 points (34 goals and 48 assists).

On the same day, the Lightning re-signed forward Cedric Paquette to a 2-year, contract extension. The cap hit on the contract is valued at $1.65 million. Paquette recorded 13 goals and 17 points last season for the Lightning.

On July 8, 2019, the Lightning signed forward Gemel Smith to a 1-year, 2-way contract. Last season Smith skated with the Dallas Stars and Boston Bruins, appearing in 17 NHL games in which he recorded 2 goals and 1 assist. In his professional career Smith has appearing in 80 NHL games, recording 11 goals and 20 points.

On July 9, 2019, the Lightning re-signed forward Danick Martel to a 1-year contract extension. Martel made the Lightning's roster last season, but primarily was healthy scratched. Martel skated in 9 games, recording 2 assists.

On July 16, 2019, the Lightning re-signed defenseman Ben Thomas to a 1-year contract extension. Thomas was drafted by the Lightning in the 2014 NHL Entry Draft, and has spent the previous seasons three seasons in the American Hockey League with the Syracuse Crunch.

On July 17, 2019, the Lightning re-signed defenseman Dominik Masin to a 1-year contract extension. Masin has spent the last three seasons playing for the Syracuse Crunch. Last season Masin skated in 69 games with the Crunch, recording 2 goals and 10 assists.

On July 29, 2019, the Lightning re-signed starting goaltender Andrei Vasilevskiy to a $76 million, 8-year contract extension. The annual cap hit is valued at $9.5 million. Vasilevskiy was coming off his first career Vezina Trophy win as the NHL's top goaltender. Vasilevskiy recorded a .925 save percentage, 2.40 goals-against average, and 6 shutouts during his Vezina campaign.

On July 30, 2019, the Lightning traded forward Ryan Callahan and the team's fifth-round 2020 draft pick to the Ottawa Senators in exchange for Mike Condon and Ottawa's 2020 sixth-round pick. The move freed up approximately $3.4 million in cap space.

August
On August 5, 2019, the Lightning signed free-agent defensemen Kevin Shattenkirk to a one-year, $1.75 million contract. Shattenkirk had played the previous two seasons for the New York Rangers before being bought out by the team. In the season prior to his buyout, Shattenkirk recorded 2 goals and 26 assists over 76 games.

On August 14, 2019, the Lightning traded forward Adam Erne to the Detroit Red Wings in exchange for a fourth-round pick in the 2020 NHL draft. Last season Erne skated in 65 games with the Lightning, recording 7 goals and 13 assists. Erne was originally acquired by the Lightning in the second-round of the 2013 NHL Entry Draft.

On August 24, 2019, the Lightning signed free-agent forward Patrick Maroon to a one-year, $900,000 contract. Maroon spent the previous season with the St. Louis Blues where he helped them capture their first Stanley Cup championship. Maroon scored 10 goals, and 28 points over 74 games in the regular season. In the playoffs Maroon recorded 3 goals and 7 points in 26 games.

Training camp

September
On September 11, 2019, the Lightning announced their training camp roster for the coming season. The camp is to be divided among three rosters, which are named after Lightning radio and television broadcasters (Rick Peckham, Phil Esposito and Bobby ‘The Chief’ Taylor). Notably absent from the roster was Lightning forward Brayden Point, who was a restricted free agent.

On September 18, 2019, the Lightning made their first round of training camp roster cuts. The team trimmed their roster of six players to reduce the camp roster down to 56 players. Lightning prospects Gabriel Fortier, Maxim Cajkovic and Quinn Schmeimann were assigned to their junior teams. 
Eli Zummack, Louis Crevier and Cody Donaghey were released from their tryout agreements.

On September 20, 2019, the Lightning placed goaltenders Mike Condon and Louis Domingue on waivers for the purpose of assignment to the Syracuse for the upcoming season. Domingue served as the Lightning's backup last season and Condon was acquired in trade of forward Ryan Callahan. The team was rumored to have been trying to trade Domingue all summer, but no trade materialized. Both goaltenders cleared waivers the following day.

On September 21, 2019, the Lightning made their second round of training camp roster cuts to reduce their roster to 42-players. The forward group cut consisted of Peter Abbandonato, Jimmy Huntington, Boris Katchouk, Alexey Lipanov, Ryan Lohin, Kevin Lynch, Mikhail Shalagin, and Dennis Yan. On defense it was Luc Snuggerud, Oleg Sosunov, Matt Spencer, and Nolan Valleau. Clint Windsor was the sole goaltender cut among the group. This group of players will report to Syracuse for training camp. Additionally, Cory Conacher, Chris Mueller and Spencer Martin were placed on waivers with the purpose of assignment to Syracuse.

On September 22, 2019, the Lightning made their third round of training cam roster cuts. The team assigned forwards Alex Barre-Boulet, Ross Colton, Cory Conacher,  Chris Mueller, Otto Somppi, and Mitchell Stephens to Syracuse. Defeseman Cal Foote and goaltender Spencer Martin were also assigned to Syracuse. Conacher, Mueller and Martin were assigned due to having cleared waivers. Forward Nolan Foote was assigned to his junior club (Kelowna Rockets). The team also placed Cameron Gaunce, Dominik Masin and Scott Wedgewood on waivers for assignment to Syracuse. All three players cleared waivers the following day.

On September 23, 2019, the Lightning announced that it had re-signed center Brayden Point to a three-year contract extension with a cap hit valued at $6.75 million annually. Point set career highs last season, recording 41 goals, 92 points and 51 assists. The team also announced that Point would not be medically cleared to play until late October due a procedure he had in the off-season.

On September 30, 2019, the Lightning made its final training camp roster cuts. The Lightning assigned forwards Danick Martel and Alexander Volkov to the Syracuse Crunch. Defenseman Luke Schenn was placed on waivers for the purpose of assignment to Syracuse. The forwards named to the opening night roster were Anthony Cirelli, Yanni Gourde, Tyler Johnson, Mathieu Joseph, Alex Killorn, Nikita Kucherov, Patrick Maroon, Ondrej Palat, Cedric Paquette, Brayden Point, Gemel Smith, Steven Stamkos, and Carter Verhaeghe. The defensemen named were Erik Cernak, Braydon Coburn, Victor Hedman, Ryan McDonagh, Jan Rutta, Mikhail Sergachev, Kevin Shattenkirk, and Luke Witkowski. Andrei Vasilevskiy and Curtis McElhinney were the starting and backup goaltenders named to the roster.

Standings

Divisional standings

Eastern Conference

Schedule and results

Preseason

|- align="center" bgcolor="ffcccc"
| 1 || September 17 || Carolina Hurricanes || 0–3 ||  || Wedgewood || Amalie Arena || 12,010 || 0–1–0 || 
|- align="center" bgcolor="ffcccc"
| 2 || September 18 || @ Carolina Hurricanes || 0–2 ||  || Martin || PNC Arena ||  || 0–2–0 || 
|- align="center" bgcolor="ccffcc"
| 3 || September 20 || Nashville Predators || 3–1 ||  || McElhinney || Amalie Arena || 13,456 || 1–2–0 || 
|- align="center" bgcolor="B0C4DE"
| 4 || September 21 || @ Nashville Predators || 4–5 || OT || Wedgewood || Bridgestone Arena ||  || 1–2–1 || 
|- align="center" bgcolor="ffcccc"
| 5 || September 24 || @ Florida Panthers || 3–6 ||  || Vasilevskiy || BB&T Center || 8,744 || 1–3–1 || 
|- align="center" bgcolor="ccffcc"
| 6 || September 26 || @ Florida Panthers || 4–2 ||  || McElhinney || BB&T Center || 8,611 || 2–3–1 || 
|- align="center" bgcolor="B0C4DE"
| 7 || September 28 || Florida Panthers || 0–1 || SO || Vasilevskiy || Amalie Arena || 14,732 || 2–3–2 || 
|-

|-
| Lightning score listed first;

Regular season

|- align="center" bgcolor="ccffcc"
| 1 || October 3 || Florida Panthers || 5–2 ||  || Vasilevskiy || Amalie Arena || 19,092 || 1–0–0 || 2 || 
|- align="center" bgcolor="ffcccc"
| 2 || October 5 || @ Florida Panthers || 3–4 ||  || Vasilevskiy || BB&T Center || 17,424 || 1–1–0 || 2 || 
|- align="center" bgcolor="B0C4DE"
| 3 || October 6 || @ Carolina Hurricanes || 3–4 || OT || McElhinney || PNC Arena || 14,125 || 1–1–1 || 3 || 
|- align="center" bgcolor="ccffcc"
| 4 || October 10 || @ Toronto Maple Leafs || 7–3 ||  || Vasilevskiy || Scotiabank Arena || 19,387 || 2–1–1 || 5 || 
|- align="center" bgcolor="ffcccc"
| 5 || October 12 || @ Ottawa Senators || 2–4 ||  || McElhinney || Canadian Tire Centre || 11,023 || 2–2–1 || 5 || 
|- align="center" bgcolor="ccffcc"
| 6 || October 15 || @ Montreal Canadiens || 3–1 ||  || Vasilevskiy || Bell Centre || 20,406 || 3–2–1 || 7 || 
|- align="center" bgcolor="ccffcc"
| 7 || October 17 || @ Boston Bruins || 4–3 || SO || Vasilevskiy || TD Garden || 17,193 || 4–2–1 || 9 || 
|- align="center" bgcolor="ffcccc"
| 8 || October 19 || Colorado Avalanche || 2–6 ||  || Vasilevskiy || Amalie Arena || 19,092 || 4–3–1 || 9 || 
|- align="center" bgcolor="ccffcc"
| 9 || October 23 || Pittsburgh Penguins || 3–2 ||  || Vasilevskiy || Amalie Arena || 19,092 || 5–3–1 || 11 || 
|- align="center" bgcolor="B0C4DE"
| 10 || October 26 || Nashville Predators || 2–3 || OT || McElhinney || Amalie Arena || 19,092 || 5–3–2 || 12 || 
|- align="center" bgcolor="ffcccc"
| 11 || October 29 || @ New York Rangers || 1–4 ||  || Vasilevskiy || Madison Square Garden || 17,196 || 5–4–2 || 12 || 
|- align="center" bgcolor="ccffcc"
| 12 || October 30 || @ New Jersey Devils || 7–6 || OT || McElhinney || Prudential Center || 13,152 || 6–4–2 || 14 || 
|-

|- align="center" bgcolor="ffcccc"
| 13 || November 1 || @ New York Islanders || 2–5 ||  || Vasilevskiy || Nassau Coliseum || 12,043 || 6–5–2 || 14 || 
|- align="center" bgcolor="ccffcc"
| 14 || November 8 || @ Buffalo Sabres || 3–2 ||  || Vasilevskiy || Ericsson Globe† || 13,230 || 7–5–2 || 16 || 
|- align="center" bgcolor="ccffcc"
| 15 || November 9 || Buffalo Sabres || 5–3 ||  || McElhinney || Ericsson Globe† || 13,339 || 8–5–2 || 18 || 
|- align="center" bgcolor="ccffcc"
| 16 || November 14 || New York Rangers || 9–3 ||  || Vasilevskiy || Amalie Arena || 19,092 || 9–5–2 || 20 || 
|- align="center" bgcolor="ffcccc"
| 17 || November 16 || Winnipeg Jets || 3–4 ||  || Vasilevskiy || Amalie Arena || 19,092 || 9–6–2 || 20 || 
|- align="center" bgcolor="ffcccc"
| 18 || November 19 || @ St. Louis Blues || 1–3 ||  || Vasilevskiy || Enterprise Center || 18,096 || 9–7–2 || 20 || 
|- align="center" bgcolor="ccffcc"
| 19 || November 21 || @ Chicago Blackhawks || 4–2 ||  || McElhinney || United Center || 21,336 || 10–7–2 || 22 || 
|- align="center" bgcolor="ccffcc"
| 20 || November 23 || Anaheim Ducks || 6–2 ||  || Vasilevskiy || Amalie Arena || 19,092 || 11–7–2 || 24 || 
|- align="center" bgcolor="ccffcc"
| 21 || November 25 || Buffalo Sabres || 5–2 ||  || Vasilevskiy || Amalie Arena || 19,092 || 12–7–2 || 26 || 
|- align="center" bgcolor="ffcccc"
| 22 || November 27 || St. Louis Blues || 3–4 ||  || Vasilevskiy || Amalie Arena || 19,092 || 12–8–2 || 26 || 
|- align="center" bgcolor="B0C4DE"
| 23 || November 29 || @ Washington Capitals || 3–4 || OT || Vasilevskiy || Capital One Arena || 18,573 || 12–8–3 || 27 || 
|- align="center" bgcolor="ffcccc"
| 24 || November 30 || Carolina Hurricanes || 2–3 ||  || McElhinney || Amalie Arena || 19,092 || 12–9–3 || 27 || 
|-
| colspan=10 | † Games played in Stockholm, Sweden 
|-

|- align="center" bgcolor="ccffcc"
| 25 || December 3 || @ Nashville Predators || 3–2 || OT || Vasilevskiy || Bridgestone Arena || 17,163 || 13–9–3 || 29 || 
|- align="center" bgcolor="ffcccc"
| 26 || December 5 || Minnesota Wild || 4–5 ||  || Vasilevskiy || Amalie Arena || 19,092 || 13–10–3 || 29 || 
|- align="center" bgcolor="ccffcc"
| 27 || December 7 || San Jose Sharks || 7–1 ||  || Vasilevskiy || Amalie Arena || 19,092 || 14–10–3 || 31 || 
|- align="center" bgcolor="ffcccc"
| 28 || December 9 || New York Islanders || 1–5 ||  || McElhinney || Amalie Arena || 19,092 || 14–11–3 || 31 || 
|- align="center" bgcolor="ccffcc"
| 29 || December 10 || @ Florida Panthers || 2–1 ||  || Vasilevskiy || BB&T Center || 10,685 || 15–11–3 || 33 || 
|- align="center" bgcolor="ccffcc"
| 30 || December 12 || Boston Bruins || 3–2 ||  || Vasilevskiy || Amalie Arena || 19,092 || 16–11–3 || 35 || 
|- align="center" bgcolor="ffcccc"
| 31 || December 14 || Washington Capitals || 2–5 ||  || Vasilevskiy || Amalie Arena || 19,092 || 16–12–3 || 35 || 
|- align="center" bgcolor="ccffcc"
| 32 || December 17 || Ottawa Senators || 4–3 || OT || Vasilevskiy || Amalie Arena || 19,092 || 17–12–3 || 37 || 
|- align="center" bgcolor="B0C4DE"
| 33 || December 19 || Dallas Stars || 3–4 || OT || Vasilevskiy || Amalie Arena || 19,092 || 17–12–4 || 38 || 
|- align="center" bgcolor="ffcccc"
| 34 || December 21 || @ Washington Capitals || 1–3 ||  || McElhinney || Capital One Arena || 18,573 || 17–13–4 || 38 || 
|- align="center" bgcolor="ccffcc"
| 35 || December 23 || Florida Panthers || 6–1 ||  || Vasilevskiy || Amalie Arena || 19,092 || 18–13–4 || 40 || 
|- align="center" bgcolor="ccffcc"
| 36 || December 28 || Montreal Canadiens || 5–4 ||  || Vasilevskiy || Amalie Arena || 19,092 || 19–13–4 || 42 || 
|- align="center" bgcolor="ccffcc"
| 37 || December 29 || Detroit Red Wings || 2–1 ||  || McElhinney || Amalie Arena || 19,092 || 20–13–4 || 44 || 
|- align="center" bgcolor="ccffcc"
| 38 || December 31 || @ Buffalo Sabres || 6–4 ||  || Vasilevskiy || KeyBank Center || 18,465 || 21–13–4 || 46 || 
|-

|- align="center" bgcolor="ccffcc"
| 39 || January 2 || @ Montreal Canadiens || 2–1 ||  || Vasilevskiy || Bell Centre || 20,904 || 22–13–4 || 48 || 
|- align="center" bgcolor="ccffcc"
| 40 || January 4 || @  Ottawa Senators || 5–3 ||  || McElhinney || Canadian Tire Centre || 13,914 || 23–13–4 || 50 || 
|- align="center" bgcolor="ccffcc"
| 41 || January 5 || @ Carolina Hurricanes || 3–1 ||  || Vasilevskiy || PNC Arena || 18,015 || 24–13–4 || 52 || 
|- align="center" bgcolor="ccffcc"
| 42 || January 7 || Vancouver Canucks || 9–2 ||  || Vasilevskiy || Amalie Arena || 19,092 || 25–13–4 || 54 || 
|- align="center" bgcolor="ccffcc"
| 43 || January 9 || Arizona Coyotes || 4–0 ||  || Vasilevskiy || Amalie Arena || 19,092 || 26–13–4 || 56 || 
|- align="center" bgcolor="ccffcc"
| 44 || January 11 || @ Philadelphia Flyers || 1–0 ||  || Vasilevskiy || Wells Fargo Center || 19,866 || 27–13–4 || 58 || 
|- align="center" bgcolor="ffcccc"
| 45 || January 12 || @ New Jersey Devils || 1–3 ||  || McElhinney || Prudential Center || 14,203 || 27–14–4 || 58 || 
|- align="center" bgcolor="ccffcc"
| 46 || January 14 || Los Angeles Kings || 4–3 || SO || Vasilevskiy || Amalie Arena || 19,092 || 28–14–4 || 60 || 
|- align="center" bgcolor="ffcccc"
| 47 || January 16 || @ Minnesota Wild || 2–3 ||  || McElhinney || Xcel Energy Center || 17,305 || 28–15–4 || 60 || 
|- align="center" bgcolor="ccffcc"
| 48 || January 17 || @ Winnipeg Jets || 7–1 ||  || Vasilevskiy || Bell MTS Place || 15,325 || 29–15–4 || 62 || 
|- align="center" bgcolor="bbbbbb"
| colspan="11"|All-Star Break (January 23–26)
|- align="center" bgcolor="B0C4DE"
| 49 || January 27 || @ Dallas Stars || 2–3 || OT || Vasilevskiy || American Airlines Center || 18,345 || 29–15–5 || 63 || 
|- align="center" bgcolor="ccffcc"
| 50 || January 29 || @ Los Angeles Kings || 4–2 ||  || Vasilevskiy || Staples Center || 18,230 || 30–15–5 || 65 || 
|- align="center" bgcolor="ccffcc"
| 51 || January 31 || @ Anaheim Ducks || 4–3 ||  || Vasilevskiy || Honda Center || 16,032 || 31–15–5 || 67 || 
|-

|- align="center" bgcolor="ccffcc"
| 52 || February 1 || @ San Jose Sharks || 3–0 ||  || McElhinney || SAP Center || 17,562 || 32–15–5 || 69 || 
|- align="center" bgcolor="ccffcc"
| 53 || February 4 || Vegas Golden Knights || 4–2 ||  || Vasilevskiy || Amalie Arena || 19,092 || 33–15–5 || 71 || 
|- align="center" bgcolor="ccffcc"
| 54 || February 6 || Pittsburgh Penguins || 4–2 ||  || Vasilevskiy || Amalie Arena || 19,092 || 34–15–5 || 73 || 
|- align="center" bgcolor="ccffcc"
| 55 || February 8 || New York Islanders || 3–1 ||  || Vasilevskiy || Amalie Arena || 19,092 || 35–15–5 || 75 || 
|- align="center" bgcolor="ccffcc"
| 56 || February 10 || @ Columbus Blue Jackets || 2–1 || OT || McElhinney || Nationwide Arena || 17,131 || 36–15–5 || 77 || 
|- align="center" bgcolor="ccffcc"
| 57 || February 11 || @ Pittsburgh Penguins || 2–1 || OT || Vasilevskiy || PPG Paints Arena || 18,445 || 37–15–5 || 79 || 
|- align="center" bgcolor="ccffcc"
| 58 || February 13 || Edmonton Oilers || 3–1 ||  || Vasilevskiy || Amalie Arena || 19,092 || 38–15–5 || 81 || 
|- align="center" bgcolor="ccffcc"
| 59 || February 15 || Philadelphia Flyers || 5–3 ||  || Vasilevskiy || Amalie Arena || 19,092 || 39–15–5 || 83 || 
|- align="center" bgcolor="ccffcc"
| 60 || February 17 || @ Colorado Avalanche ||  4–3 || OT || McElhinney || Pepsi Center || 18,107 || 40–15–5  || 85 || 
|- align="center" bgcolor="ffcccc"
| 61 || February 20 || @ Vegas Golden Knights || 3–5 ||  || Vasilevskiy || T-Mobile Arena || 18,376 || 40–16–5 || 85 || 
|- align="center" bgcolor="ffcccc"
| 62 || February 22 || @ Arizona Coyotes || 3–7 ||  || Vasilevskiy || Gila River Arena || 14,825 || 40–17–5 || 85 || 
|- align="center" bgcolor="ffcccc"
| 63 || February 25 || Toronto Maple Leafs || 3–4 ||  || Vasilevskiy || Amalie Arena || 19,092 || 40–18–5 || 85 || 
|- align="center" bgcolor="ffcccc"
| 64 || February 27 || Chicago Blackhawks || 2–5 ||  || McElhinney || Amalie Arena || 19,092 || 40–19–5 || 85 || 
|- align="center" bgcolor="ccffcc"
| 65 || February 29 || Calgary Flames || 4–3 ||  || Vasilevskiy || Amalie Arena || 19,092 || 41–19–5 || 87 || 
|-

|- align="center" bgcolor="ffcccc"
| 66 || March 3 || Boston Bruins || 1–2 ||  || Vasilevskiy || Amalie Arena || 19,092 || 41–20–5 || 87 || 
|- align="center" bgcolor="ccffcc"
| 67 || March 5 || Montreal Canadiens || 4–0 ||  || Vasilevskiy || Amalie Arena || 19,092 || 42–20–5 || 89 || 
|- align="center" bgcolor="ccffcc"
| 68 || March 7 || @ Boston Bruins || 5–3 ||  || Vasilevskiy || TD Garden || 17,850 || 43–20–5 || 91 || 
|- align="center" bgcolor="B0C4DE"
| 69 || March 8 || @ Detroit Red Wings || 4–5 || OT || McElhinney || Little Caesars Arena || 18,841 || 43–20–6 || 92 || 
|- align="center" bgcolor="ffcccc"
| 70 || March 10 || @ Toronto Maple Leafs || 1–2 ||  || Vasilevskiy || Scotiabank Arena || 19,124 || 43–21–6 || 92 || 
|-

|- align="center" bgcolor=""
| 71 || March 12 || Philadelphia Flyers || Amalie Arena
|- align="center" bgcolor=""
| 72 || March 14 || Detroit Red Wings || Amalie Arena
|- align="center" bgcolor=""
| 73 || March 15 || New Jersey Devils || Amalie Arena
|- align="center" bgcolor=""
| 74 || March 18 || @ Vancouver Canucks || Rogers Arena 
|- align="center" bgcolor=""
| 75 || March 20 || @ Edmonton Oilers || Rogers Place
|- align="center" bgcolor=""
| 76 || March 21 || @ Calgary Flames || Scotiabank Saddledome
|- align="center" bgcolor=""
| 77 || March 25 || Toronto Maple Leafs || Amalie Arena
|- align="center" bgcolor=""
| 78 || March 27 || Columbus Blue Jackets || Amalie Arena
|- align="center" bgcolor=""
| 79 || March 28  || New York Rangers || Amalie Arena
|- align="center" bgcolor=""
| 80 || March 31 || Ottawa Senators || Amalie Arena
|- align="center" bgcolor=""
| 81 || April 2 || @ Columbus Blue Jackets || Nationwide Arena
|- align="center" bgcolor=""
| 82 || April 4 || @ Detroit Red Wings || Little Caesars Arena
|-

|-
| Lightning score listed first;

Playoffs

|- align="center" bgcolor="ccffcc"
| 1 || August 3 || Washington Capitals || 3–2 || SO || Vasilevskiy || 1–0–0 || 2 || 
|- align="center" bgcolor="ccffcc"
| 2 || August 5 || @ Boston Bruins || 3–2 ||  || Vasilevskiy || 2–0–0 || 4 || 
|- align="center" bgcolor="ffcccc"
| 3 || August 8 || Philadelphia Flyers || 1–4 ||  || Vasilevskiy || 2–1–0 || 4 || 
|-
| colspan=9 | † Games played at Scotiabank Arena in Toronto, Ontario, Canada
|-

|-
| Lightning score listed first;

|- align="center" bgcolor="ccffcc"
| 1 || August 11 || Columbus Blue Jackets || 3–2 || 5OT || Vasilevskiy || 1–0 || 
|- align="center" bgcolor="ffcccc"
| 2 || August 13 || Columbus Blue Jackets || 1–3 ||  || Vasilevskiy || 1–1 || 
|- align="center" bgcolor="ccffcc"
| 3 || August 15 || @ Columbus Blue Jackets || 3–2 ||  || Vasilevskiy || 2–1 || 
|- align="center" bgcolor="ccffcc"
| 4 || August 17 || @ Columbus Blue Jackets || 2–1 ||  || Vasilevskiy || 3–1 ||  
|- align="center" bgcolor="ccffcc"
| 5 || August 19 || Columbus Blue Jackets || 5–4 || OT || Vasilevskiy || 4–1 ||  
|-
| colspan=10 | † Games played at Scotiabank Arena in Toronto, Ontario, Canada
|-

|- align="center" bgcolor="ffcccc"
| 1 || August 23 || Boston Bruins || 2–3 ||  || Vasilevskiy || 0–1 ||  
|- align="center" bgcolor="ccffcc"
| 2 || August 25 || Boston Bruins || 4–3 || OT || Vasilevskiy || 1–1 ||  
|- align="center" bgcolor="ccffcc"
| 3 || August 26 || @ Boston Bruins || 7–1 ||  || Vasilevskiy || 2–1 ||  
|- align="center" bgcolor="ccffcc"
| 4 || August 29 || @ Boston Bruins || 3–1 ||  || Vasilevskiy || 3–1 ||  
|- align="center" bgcolor="ccffcc"
| 5 || August 31 || Boston Bruins || 3–2 || 2OT || Vasilevskiy || 4–1 ||  
|-
| colspan=10|† Games played at Scotiabank Arena in Toronto, Ontario, Canada
|-

|- align="center" bgcolor="ccffcc"
| 1 || September 7 || New York Islanders || 8–2 ||  || Vasilevskiy || 1–0 || 
|- align="center" bgcolor="ccffcc"
| 2 || September 9 || New York Islanders || 2–1 ||  || Vasilevskiy || 2–0 || 
|- align="center" bgcolor="ffcccc"
| 3 || September 11 || @ New York Islanders || 3–5 ||  || Vasilevskiy || 2–1 || 
|- align="center" bgcolor="ccffcc"
| 4 || September 13 || @ New York Islanders || 4–1 ||  || Vasilevskiy || 3–1 || 
|- align="center" bgcolor="ffcccc"
| 5 || September 15 || New York Islanders || 1–2 || 2OT || Vasilevskiy || 3–2 || 
|- align="center" bgcolor="ccffcc"
| 6 || September 17 || @ New York Islanders || 2–1 || OT || Vasilevskiy || 4–2 || 
|-
| colspan=10|† Games played at Rogers Place in Edmonton, Alberta, Canada
|-

|- align="center" bgcolor="ffcccc"
| 1 || September 19 || Dallas Stars || 1–4 ||  || Vasilevskiy || 0–1 || 
|- align="center" bgcolor="ccffcc"
| 2 || September 21 || Dallas Stars || 3–2 ||  || Vasilevskiy || 1–1 || 
|- align="center" bgcolor="ccffcc"
| 3 || September 23 || @ Dallas Stars || 5–2 ||  || Vasilevskiy || 2–1 || 
|- align="center" bgcolor="ccffcc"
| 4 || September 25 || @ Dallas Stars || 5–4 || OT || Vasilevskiy || 3–1 || 
|- align="center" bgcolor="ffcccc"
| 5 || September 26 || Dallas Stars || 2–3 || 2OT || Vasilevskiy || 3–2 || 
|- align="center" bgcolor="ccffcc"
| 6 || September 28 || @ Dallas Stars || 2–0 ||  || Vasilevskiy || 4–2 || 
|-
| colspan=10|† Games played at Rogers Place in Edmonton, Alberta, Canada
|-

|-
| Lightning score listed first;

Player stats
Final

Skaters

Goaltenders

†Denotes player spent time with another team before joining Tampa Bay.  Stats reflect time with Tampa Bay only.
‡Traded from Tampa Bay mid-season.
Bold/italics denotes franchise record

Suspensions/fines

Awards and honours

Awards

Milestones

Transactions
The Lightning have been involved in the following transactions during the 2019–20 season.

Trades

Free agents

Waivers

Contract terminations

Retirement

Signings

Draft picks

Below are the Tampa Bay Lightning's selections at the 2019 NHL Entry Draft, which was held on June 21 and 22, 2019, at Rogers Arena in Vancouver, British Columbia.

Notes:
 The Vancouver Canucks' third-round pick went to the Tampa Bay Lightning as the result of a trade on June 22, 2019, that sent J. T. Miller to Vancouver in exchange for Marek Mazanec, a conditional first-round pick 2020 and this pick.
 The Chicago Blackhawks' seventh-round pick went to the Tampa Bay Lightning as the result of a trade on January 11, 2019, that sent Slater Koekkoek and a fifth-round pick in 2019 to Chicago in exchange for Jan Rutta and this pick.

Notes
In the Round-Robin Seeding games the format followed that of the regular season. This meant there was a possibility of the game ending in overtime or a shootout. The regular playoff games followed the traditional format of sudden death overtime. 
As the result of COVID-19 the Eastern Conference final games were held in the playoff bubble at Rogers Place in Edmonton, Alberta.

References

Tampa Bay Lightning seasons
Tampa Bay Lightning
Tampa Bay Lightning
Tampa Bay Lightning
Eastern Conference (NHL) championship seasons
Tampa
Stanley Cup championship seasons